Wrestling was one of the sports which was held at the 1958 Asian Games in Korakuen Ice Palace, Tokyo, Japan between 25 and 27 May 1958. The competition included only men's freestyle events.

The competition used a form of negative points tournament, with negative points given for any result short of a fall.

Schedule

Medalists

Medal table

Participating nations
A total of 44 athletes from 7 nations competed in wrestling at the 1958 Asian Games:

References
 www.fila-wrestling.com

External links
UWW Database

 
1958 Asian Games events
1958
Asian Games
1958 Asian Games